Alenka Kejžar is an Olympic class swimmer. She was born on 15 February 1979 in Kranj, Slovenia. Kejžar attended Southern Methodist University in Dallas, Texas.

Her coaches were Ciril Globočnik  and Steve Collins. Her swimming career began in 1987, and ended in 2004. She participated in three consecutive Summer Olympics, starting in 1996 Summer Olympics in Atlanta. She has won medals in World Championships, World Cups and European Championships.

Kejžar has been working as a swimming teacher for New International School of Thailand in Bangkok since 2005. Her sister, Nataša Kejžar, is also a former Olympic swimmer.

References
2004 Olympic Record

1979 births
Living people
Female medley swimmers
Slovenian female swimmers
Olympic swimmers of Slovenia
Swimmers at the 1996 Summer Olympics
Swimmers at the 2000 Summer Olympics
Swimmers at the 2004 Summer Olympics
Sportspeople from Kranj
Southern Methodist University alumni
Medalists at the FINA World Swimming Championships (25 m)
European Aquatics Championships medalists in swimming